Aripeka is an unincorporated community and census-designated place (CDP) in the U.S. state of Florida, along coast of the Gulf of Mexico at the border dividing Pasco and Hernando counties. The ZIP Code for the community is 34679, but it was originally assigned as 33502. As of the 2020 census, the population was 320.

Geography

Similar in geophysical structure to Hernando Beach, Bayport, and Pine Island, Florida, Aripeka is surrounded by marshland, mostly within Hernando County. The Pasco-Hernando county line is located at the South Hammock Creek Bridge.

Demographics

History
The community of Gulf Key was settled in this area in 1873 and a post office by that name was established in 1883. The post office was known briefly as, "Argo". It was replaced by the Aripeka post office in 1895. Aripeka is named for an early nineteenth-century Seminole chief, who is thought to have lived nearby. The town was divided when Pasco County separated from Hernando County in 1887. The post office, which was originally in Hernando County, moved across the Pasco County line in 1921. According to the historical marker in the town, Babe Ruth visited Aripeka to fish. On June 3, 1993, the Pasco County Historic Preservation Committee dedicated the town a State Historic Site.

Notable residents
 James Rosenquist, an artist, maintained "a home, an office and studio space" during his later years.

Transportation
The main road through Aripeka is County Road 595, named Aripeka Road in Pasco County and Osowaw Boulevard in Hernando County. This road was part of the original Dixie Highway and suffers frequent flooding in the heart of town due to its close proximity to the water. CR 595 leads southeast  to U.S. Route 19 and northeast , also to US 19.

References

External links
Pasco County Pictures of Historical Markers (Aripeka)
Origins of Place Names (History of Pasco County)

Census-designated places in Hernando County, Florida
Census-designated places in Pasco County, Florida
Populated coastal places in Florida on the Gulf of Mexico
Census-designated places in Florida
Unincorporated communities in Hernando County, Florida
Unincorporated communities in Pasco County, Florida
Unincorporated communities in Florida